The 2015–16 New Mexico Lobos men's basketball team represented the University of New Mexico during the 2015–16 NCAA Division I men's basketball season as a member of the Mountain West Conference. They played their home games at The Pit in Albuquerque, New Mexico. The Lobos were led by third year head coach Craig Neal. They finished the season 17–15, 10–8 in Mountain West play to finish in a tie for fourth place. They lost in the quarterfinals of the Mountain West tournament to Nevada.

Previous season
The Lobos finished the season 15–16, 7–11 in Mountain West play to finish in eighth place. They lost in the first round of the Mountain West tournament to Air Force.

Offseason

Departures

Incoming transfers

2015 recruiting class

Roster

Schedule

|-
!colspan=12 style="background:#D3003F; color:white;"| Exhibition

|-
!colspan=12 style="background:#D3003F; color:white;"| Non-conference regular season

|-
!colspan=12 style="background:#D3003F; color:white;"| Mountain West regular season

|-
!colspan=12 style="background:#D3003F; color:white;"| Mountain West tournament

References

New Mexico Lobos men's basketball seasons
New Mexico
2015 in sports in New Mexico
2016 in sports in New Mexico